Britta Lindmark (30 March 1929 – 10 March 2019) was a Swedish figure skater. She competed in the pairs event at the 1952 Winter Olympics.

References

1929 births
2019 deaths
Swedish female pair skaters
Olympic figure skaters of Sweden
Figure skaters at the 1952 Winter Olympics
Sportspeople from Stockholm